These are the official results of the Women's marathon at the 1982 European Championships in Athens, Greece. The race was held on 12 September 1982. This was the first time that women's marathon was featured at a major athletics competition.

Medalists

Abbreviations
All times shown are in hours:minutes:seconds

Startlist

Intermediates

Final ranking

Participation
According to an unofficial count, 27 athletes from 17 countries participated in the event.

 (1)
 (1)
 (2)
 (2)
 (2)
 (1)
 (1)
 (3)
 (1)
 (1)
 (1)
 (3)
 (1)
 (1)
 (1)
 (2)
 (3)

See also
 1982 Marathon Year Ranking
 1983 Women's World Championships Marathon (Helsinki)
 1984 Women's Olympic Marathon (Los Angeles)
 1987 Women's World Championships Marathon (Rome)
 1988 Women's Olympic Marathon (Seoul)

References

 Results
 marathonspiegel

Marathon
Marathons at the European Athletics Championships
1982 marathons
Women's marathons
European Athletics Championships marathon
1982 Athletics
Women in Athens